Taichung Apollo is a Taiwanese volleyball team based in Taichung, Taiwan. They compete in the Top Volleyball League.

History
The team is composed of the Feng Yuan Commercial High School volleyball team alumni.

The team took part in their inaugural Top Volleyball League season in 2007 as Chunlee Consulting under the sponsorship of Chunlee Consulting. The team did not participate in 2008 season and resumed in 2009–10 season, with the name Easy Harvest under the sponsorship of East Harvest Sporting Equipment Co., LTD. In 2014, the team was sponsored by Brilliant Footwear Corporation and renamed Taichung Lien Chuang, named after the chairman Lien Hua-Jung's son, Lien Chuang. The Lien Chuang signed Serbian outside hitter Milan Perić and Pakistani opposite Aimal Khan, becoming the first two teams to sign import players in Top Volleyball League history. Despite the Lien Chuang finished as runner-up in the season, the team had faced operational issues and the sponsorship was taken over by C-LiFe Technologies, Inc. The team was renamed Taichung Longpower for the following seasons. In 2021, the team was renamed Taichung Apollo.

Team
Squad as of October 2022

Honours
Top Volleyball League
  (x4) 2015, 2018–19, 2020–21, 2021–22
  (x6) 2009–10, 2011, 2012, 2016, 2017–18, 2019–20

References

External links
 

Volleyball clubs established in 2007
2007 establishments in Taiwan
Sport in Taichung